5F-ADBICA (also known as 5F-ADB-PICA) is an indole-based synthetic cannabinoid that is a potent agonist at CB1 receptors and CB2 receptors with EC50 values of 0.77 nM and 1.2 nM respectively.

Legal Status

China
As of October 2015 5F-ADBICA is a controlled substance in China.

See also 

 ADBICA
 ADB-PINACA
 APICA
 PX-1
 SDB-001
 STS-135

References 

Cannabinoids
Designer drugs
Indolecarboxamides
Organofluorides